Nestor Montague "Monty" Berman (16 August 1913 in Whitechapel, London, England – 14 June 2006 in London, England) was a British cinematographer and film and television producer.

Early career
Berman began his film career as a camera assistant at Twickenham Film Studios when he was 17. He became a camera operator in 1934, working for the Associated British Picture Corporation at Teddington Studios, and later for the comedy producers Ealing Studios.
 
When World War II came, Berman was allowed to continue his craft in an army film unit.  There, he met and befriended Robert S. Baker, with whom he would go on to form a lifelong business partnership.

In 1948, they founded Tempean Films, which produced more than 30 B-movies in the 1950s.  In 1962, Berman and Baker obtained the television rights to Leslie Charteris's The Saint.

Unable to sell the rights to Associated-Rediffusion, then Britain's largest commercial television company, Berman turned to Lew Grade's ITC. This company was at that time a sister company to ATV, and had access to important export markets. This allowed The Saint to do well in both Britain and in other markets.

Work with Dennis Spooner
Berman created more ITC productions, starting with The Baron, which led to a partnership with Dennis Spooner, one of the show's writers and Ray Austin, writer director.  By 1967 they had launched a production company which created The Champions, Department S, its spin-off Jason King, Randall and Hopkirk (Deceased), and The Adventurer. Berman retired from production after working on The Adventurer.

References

External links
 
 The Morning After ITC fan site
 Television Heaven fan site on The Saint
Monty Berman interview - British Entertainment History Project on History Project website

ITC Entertainment
1913 births
2006 deaths
English film producers
English cinematographers
English television producers
20th-century English businesspeople